Alberta Provincial Highway No. 48, commonly referred to as Highway 48, has been the designation of two separate highways in Alberta's history. The first was a north–south highway in southern Alberta, Canada that existed between the 1950s and 1979.  It now forms the southernmost portion of Highway 41. The current Alberta highway 48 connects to Northwest Territories Highway 5 at the Northwest Territories boarder in Fort Smith NWT to Fort Fitzgerald and Hay Camp Road. The road was chip sealed in July 2021.

Current Highway

The current Alberta Highway 48 was previously known as the Fort Fitzgerald Highway. In 2020 the Regional Municipality of Wood Buffalo spent $4.1 million to begin upgrades of the highway. It was designated Alberta Highway 48 in 2020 and Alberta Highway 48 signs with the new Alberta wordmark were installed in 2021 when Chip Sealing of the road was completed at the border. Construction was completed by Rowe's Construction from Hay River.

The road runs from the Northwest Territories border at Northwest Territories Highway 5 (Fort Smith Highway) in Fort Smith, through the Smith Landing first nation, Pine Lake road which enters Wood Buffalo national Park and ends at Hay Camp Road and Fort Fitzgerald. The road parallels the Trans Canada Trail and also provides access to the Fort Smith Winter Club. The road is not contiguous with any other provincial highway.

Border restrictions
In 2020 the Northwest Territories established a border checkpoint to regulate traffic on Highway 48 as part of its COVID-19 restrictions for traffic and people coming from Alberta and Wood Buffalo. It was removed in August 2021.

Highway 48 1950's to 1979

Other than the small hamlet of Elkwater within Cypress Hills Provincial Park, Highway 48 did not pass through any communities.

Highway 41 was developed in the 1960s and 1970s northeast of Medicine Hat; and in 1979, Highway 48 was renumbered and became part of Highway 41.

References 

048